Saeed Orokzai is an Afghan filmmaker best known for the 1979 film Mardara Qawl Ast (meaning "Men Keep Their Promise").

Early life 
Saeed Orokzai is from Kabul, Afghanistan, and attended the Kabul University to study Persian literature. Upon graduating he worked for Afghanistan National Radio and TV before entering filmmaking.

Recognition 
Saeed Orokzai was awarded the Platinum Award for his short film, Yesterday (2017), in the Best Drama category by the European Independent Film Awards. He received the Gold Award for directing his feature film, Why?, by the FYFF Filmmakers of the Year Film Festival. The film was also recognized by the World Awards of Merit.

References

External links 
 
 https://www.wionews.com/south-asia/directors-cut-the-afghan-woman-making-waves-at-all-male-film-board-250739
 https://www.nouvelobs.com/societe/20190920.AFP5028/afghanistan-la-realisatrice-qui-s-impose-dans-un-cinema-d-hommes.html
 
 https://www.france24.com/en/20190920-director-s-cut-the-afghan-woman-making-waves-at-all-male-film-board
 
 
 
 https://www.amazon.co.uk/Why-Ali-Saeed/dp/B083771WPH/ref=sr_1_1?keywords=%22Ali+Saeed%22&qid=1581820185&s=instant-video&sr=1-1
 
 https://www.rfi.fr/es/contenu/20190921-una-directora-para-resucitar-el-cine-afgano-dominado-por-los-hombres

Living people
Afghan film directors
Persian-language film directors
Year of birth missing (living people)